The XX 2016 Pan Am Badminton Championships were held in Campinas, Brazil, between 28 April and 1 May 2016.

Venue
Clube Fonte São Paulo, within the Vila Itapura of Campinas, São Paulo, Brazil.

Medalists

References

External links
Official website
TournamentSoftware.com: Individual Results
TournamentSoftware.com: Team Results

Pan Am Badminton Championships
Pan Am Badminton Championships
Badminton tournaments in Brazil
International sports competitions hosted by Brazil